Kitten's First Full Moon is a children's picture book written and illustrated by Kevin Henkes. Published in 2004, the book tells the story of a kitten who thinks the moon is a bowl of milk and tries many different attempts to drink it. Henkes won the 2005 Caldecott Medal for his illustrations. The book is in black and white and typeset in sans-serif. The idea came from a line in another book by Henkes, "The cat thought the moon was a bowl of milk." Henkes gradually expanded on that for Kitten's First Full Moon.

References

2004 children's books
Caldecott Medal–winning works
Children's fiction books
HarperCollins books
Fictional cats
Books about cats
American picture books